This paleoentomology list records new  fossil insect taxa that were to be described during the year 2021, as well as notes other significant paleoentomology discoveries and events which occurred during that year.

Clade Amphiesmenoptera

Lepidoptera

Lepidopteran research
 The first known Cretaceous caterpillar armoured with spines is described from the Burmese amber by Haug & Haug (2021).
 Fossil leaf mine produced by a lyonetiid-like leaf-mining moth, representing the oldest record of such moths reported to date, is described from the Upper Cretaceous (Campanian) Kaiparowits Formation (Utah, United States) by Maccracken et al. (2021), who name a new ichnotaxon Leucopteropsa spiralae.

Trichopterans

Clade Antliophora

Dipterans

Dipteran research
 Baranov et al. (2021) document a high diversity of fly larvae from the Eocene Baltic amber, preserving taxonomically, morphologically, and ecologically important characters, and evaluate the implications of this finding for the knowledge of the functional ecology of the Eocene fly larvae.

Mecopterans

Clade Archaeorthoptera

†Caloneurodea

†Cnemidolestodea

Orthopterans

Orthopteran research
 Revision of the fossil record of the family Trigonidiidae is published by Desutter-Grandcolas et al. (2021).

†Titanoptera

Other archaeorthopterans

Clade Coleopterida

Coleoptera

Adephaga

Archostemata

Myxophaga

Polyphaga

Bostrichiformia

Cucujiformia

Cucujiformia research
 A piece of Burmese amber preserving the complete series of free-living stages (except of the last larval instar) of a Cretaceous  parasitoid beetle Paleoripiphorus is described by Batelka, Engel & Prokop (2021).

Elateriformia

Elateriformia research
 A study on the anatomy and phylogenetic relationships of Archaeolus funestus is published by Li et al. (2021).
 A study on the morphological diversity of larvae of extant and fossil members of the family Brachypsectridae is published by Haug et al. (2021).

Scarabaeiformia

Staphyliniformia

Coleopteran research
 A study on the evolution of beetles from the Early Permian to Middle Triassic, evaluating the impact of the Permian–Triassic extinction event on beetle diversity, is published by Zhao et al. (2021).
 Revision of Notocupes undatabdominus and N. ? multituberatus from the Lower Cretaceous of South China is published by Li, Huang & Cai (2021), who argue that both species do not belong to the genus Notocupes, transfer N. ? multituberatus to the genus Lasiosyne, and consider "N." undatabdominus to be likely a member of the family Artematopodidae.
 The oldest solid wood-borer larvae reported to date (belonging to the families Buprestidae and possibly Cerambycidae) are described from the Cretaceous amber from Myanmar by Haug et al. (2021).
 Mitochondrial genomes and nuclear ribosomal DNA of beetles, in some cases identifiable to species, are recovered from pack rat middens from California (United States) and Baja California (Mexico) dating up to ~ 34,355 years before present by Smith et al. (2021).

Clade Dictyoptera

Dictyopteran research
 A study on the phylogenetic placement of the family Umenocoleidae, based on data from a new specimen of Umenocoleus sinuatus from the Lower Cretaceous Zhonggou Formation (China), is published by Liuo et al. (2021).
 Description of new alienopterid nymphs from the Cretaceous Burmese amber, and a study on life history and affinities of alienopterids, is published by Luo et al. (2021).
 A study on the sensory organs of Huablattula hui, and on their implications for the knowledge of the ecology of this cockroach, is published by Taniguchi et al. (2021).

Clade †Glosselytrodea

Hymenopterans

Hymenopteran Research
 Guo et al. (2021) report the discovery of two queen ant specimens from Burmese amber, belonging to the species Haidomyrmex cerberus and including the first known alate queen in Haidomyrmex.
 Cooccurrence of ants belonging to extant Holarctic genus Lasius and a tropical weaver ant in the same piece of amber is reported from the Bitterfeld amber (Germany) by Radchenko & Perkovsky (2021).
 Original claims that both Melittosphex burmensis and Discoscapa apicula were primitive bees have been rejected by Rosa & Melo, who instead consider the former to be an aculeate wasp of uncertain affinity, and the latter to belong within the crabronid wasp subfamily Crabroninae, a lineage not directly related to bees.

Clade Neuropterida

Neuropterans

Neuropteran research
 Review of the known record of spoon-winged lacewing larvae is published Haug, Haug & Haug (2021), who report two specimens from the Cretaceous amber from Myanmar which might represent the first known larvae of members of the subfamily Nemopterinae in the fossil record.
 New lacewing larvae with elongated mouthparts are described from the Cretaceous amber from Myanmar by Haug et al. (2021), who also review the morphological diversity of fossil lacewing larvae.

Raphidiopterans

Clade †Palaeodictyopteroidea

†Megasecoptera

†Palaeodictyoptera

Palaeodictyopteran research
 A study on the anatomy of fossil specimens described as consecutive series of different larval stages of palaeodictyopteran species Tchirkovaea guttata and Paimbia fenestrata, evaluating their implications for the knowledge of wing development in palaeodictyopterans, is published by Rosová, Sinitshenkova & Prokop (2021).

Clade Palaeoptera

Ephemeroptera

Ephemeropteran research
 Sroka et al. (2021) provide new information on the morphology of Permian stem-mayflies Misthodotes sharovi and M. zalesskyi from the Tshekarda locality (Kungurian Koshelevka Formation; Perm Krai, Russia), and infer the life history traits of both the adult and larval stages of these insects.
 Possible underwater mayfly burrows are described from the Turonian Ferron Sandstone (Utah, United States) by King et al. (2021), who interpret this finding as evidence that burrowing mayflies adapted to domicile filter-feeding during or prior to the Turonian, and name a new ichnospecies Glossifungites gingrasi.

Odonatoptera

Odonata

Odonate research
 Archibald et al. (2021) establish a new, extinct suborder of Odonata named Cephalozygoptera, close to but distinct from damselflies, composed of the families Dysagrionidae, Sieblosiidae and possibly Whetwhetaksidae; their study is subsequently criticized by Nel & Zheng (2021), who consider evidence presented by Archibald et al. to be insufficient to support a new clade, and reject the suborder Cephalozygoptera as unfounded.

†Protozygoptera

Other odonatopterans

Clade †Paoliidea

†Paoliida

Clade Paraneoptera

Hemipterans

Hemipteran research
 Grimaldi & Vea (2021) reinterpret Mesophthirus engeli as a scale insect, and reject the interpretation of this insect as an ectoparasite.
 Redescription of the holotype specimen of Paranoika placida is published by Moura-Júnior et al. (2021), who transfer this species to the genus Lethocerus, and consider this species to be the senior synonym of Lethocerus vetus.
 A fulgorid specimen, representing the oldest occurrence of this family in the fossil record in Asia, is described from the Eocene Lunpola Basin (Qinghai-Tibetan Plateau, China) by Xu et al. (2021).
 Revision of the fossil record of Fulgoromorpha and Cicadomorpha from the Jurassic and Cretaceous of eastern Asia is published by Chen (2021).

Psocodeans

Psocodean research
 Four bark lice carrying sand granules and organic material atop their back are described from the Cretaceous amber from Myanmar by Kiesmüller et al. (2021), who interpret this finding as the first fossil evidence of masking behaviour in Cretaceous representatives of Psocodea.

Clade Perlidea

Dermapterans

Plecoptera

Other insects

Research
 A well-preserved full-body impression of an elongate winged insect strongly resembling stick insects is described from the Permian (Wordian) Pelitic Formation (France) by Logghe et al. (2021), who name a new ichnotaxon Phasmichnus radagasti.
 A dragonfly-type odonatopteran larva, preserving ancestral morphological characters maintained in mayflies but lost in modern odonatan larvae, is described from the Cretaceous Burmese amber by Haug, Müller & Haug (2021).

General research
 Revision of the fossil record of insects from the Triassic of China is published by Zhang et al. (2021).
 A study on the diversity of insect damage types in fossil plants from the Cretaceous (Albian to Cenomanian) Dakota Formation (United States), evaluating their implications for the knowledge of the early evolution of angiosperm florivory and associated pollination, is published by Xiao et al. (2021).

References

2021 in paleontology
Paleoentomology
2021-related lists